The Minister for Foreign Affairs of the Republic of Seychelles is a cabinet minister in charge of the Ministry of Foreign Affairs of Seychelles, responsible for conducting foreign relations of the country.

The following is a list of foreign ministers of Seychelles since its founding in 1976:

See also
 Ministry of Foreign Affairs (Seychelles)

References

Foreign
Foreign Ministers of Seychelles